Deborah Elizabeth Spillane  (born 25 December 1955) is an Australian sports journalist and commentator.

Early life and education
Spillane was born in Sydney, and was educated at Bethlehem College, Ashfield and received a Bachelor of Arts from the University of Sydney.

Media career
In 1984, she joined the Australian Broadcasting Corporation as a sports commentator and reporter, and was the first full-time female broadcaster hired by ABC Sport. In the same year was sent as a reporter to the 1984 Summer Olympics in Los Angeles, and two years later to the 1986 Commonwealth Games in Edinburgh. She was a sideline reporter for ABC's rugby league coverage, and was the first woman to commentate cricket on ABC Radio.

From 1990 to 1995, Spillane co-hosted the drive time program Hard Coffee with Ian Rogerson for Triple J. Around the same time, she was a regular panelist on Andrew Denton's Live and Sweaty program from 1991 to 1994.

In 1995, Spillane left the ABC and became the media manager of the Bulldogs national rugby league team. She continued in several sports/media-related endeavours including as media manager of the West Sydney Razorbacks basketball team; as a sports columnist for The Sun-Herald and The Australian; and on the radio stations 2GB, 2Day FM, New FM, KICK AM and 2BL.

In 2002, she returned to the ABC as part of the broadcasting team for ABC NewsRadio, and in 2012 became the host of ABC Radio's Grandstand program.

She was awarded 2017 Australian Sports Commission Media Award for Lifetime Achievement.

Bibliography
In 2007, Allen & Unwin published Spillane's autobiography, titled Where Do You Think You're Goin', Lady?: Adventures of a Sports-mad Redhead.

References

1955 births
Living people
Australian sports journalists
Australian women journalists
Australian women radio presenters
Australian sports broadcasters
Triple J announcers
Members of the Order of Australia
University of Sydney alumni